The Georgia State Patrol (GSP) was established in March 1937 in the U.S. state of Georgia and is a division of the Georgia Department of Public Safety. It is the primary state patrol agency for the U.S. state of Georgia. Troopers operate primarily on the state’s Interstate systems conducting speed enforcement and interdicting drugs and other criminal activities. I-95 heading towards Savannah, Brunswick, and the state of Florida is a major location for GSP troopers due to the high volume of drugs and other criminal activity on that interstate. GSP troopers also investigate traffic crashes and enforce traffic and criminal laws on the state's roads.

History
The Department of Public Safety was created as Georgia citizens complained about increased traffic fatalities, crime, and a need for a larger law enforcement agency with statewide arrest powers. Georgia lawmakers decided to create the State Patrol. In 1937, Governor E.D. Rivers appointed Philip H. Brewster, Sr. as its first permanent commissioner.  That summer the first Trooper School was held at Georgia Tech.  Eighty troopers graduated the first year. To date, the Georgia State Patrol has graduated 106 Trooper Schools.

Rank structure

Patrol troops and posts

Troops (A-I) and Posts (1-52)
 Troop A - Includes the following counties: Bartow, Catoosa, Chattooga, Cherokee, Dade, Floyd, Gordon, Haralson, Murray, Paulding, Pickens, Polk, Walker, Whitfield.
 Post 3 - Cartersville, Post 5 - Dalton, Post 28 - Jasper, Post 29 - Paulding, Post 38 - Rome, Post 41 - LaFayette, Post 43 - Calhoun.
 Troop B - Includes the following counties: Banks, Barrow, Clarke, Elbert, Dawson, Fannin, Forsyth, Franklin, Gilmer, Habersham, Hall, Hart, Jackson, Lumpkin, Madison, Oconee, Rabun, Stephens, Towns, Union, White.
 Post 6 - Gainesville, Post 7 - Toccoa, Post 27 - Blue Ridge, Post 32 - Athens, Post 37 - Cumming, Post 52 - Hartwell
 Troop C - Includes the following counties: Clayton, Cobb, DeKalb, Fulton and Gwinnett
 Post 9 - Marietta, (Cobb and Fulton north of I-20 and I-285), Post 47 - Forest Park (Outside I-285), Post 48 - Atlanta (Inside and including I-285), Post 49 - Motorcycle Unit (Metro Atlanta Enforcement), Post 50 - Capitol Hill (Georgia State Capitol Complex), Post 51 - Gwinnett (I-85, I-985, and State Route 316)
 Troop D - Includes the following counties: Bibb, Butts, Carroll, Crawford, Coweta, Douglas, Harris, Heard, Henry, Fayette, Lamar, Meriwether, Monroe, Muscogee, Pike, Spalding, Talbot, Taylor, Troup, Upson
 Post 1 - Griffin, Post 2 - LaGrange, Post 4 - Villa Rica, Post 24 - Newnan, Post 26 - Thomaston, Post 34 - Manchester, Post 44 - Forsyth
 Troop E - Includes the following counties: Baldwin, Columbia, Glascock, Greene, Hancock, Jasper, Jones, Lincoln, Putnam, McDuffie, Morgan, Newton, Oglethorpe, Richmond, Rockdale, Taliaferro, Walton, Warren, Washington, Wilkes
  Post 8 - Madison, Post 17 - Washington, Post 25 - Grovetown, Post 33 - Milledgeville, Post 46 - Monroe
 Troop F - Includes the following counties: Appling, Bleckley, Bulloch, Burke, Candler, Davis, Dodge, Emanuel, Evans, Jefferson, Jenkins, Johnson, Laurens, Montgomery, Screven, Tattnall, Telfair, Toombs, Treutlen, Twiggs, Wheeler, Wilkinson
  Post 16 - Helena, Post 18 - Reidsville, Post 19 - Swainsboro, Post 20 - Dublin, Post 21 - Sylvania, Post 45 - Statesboro
 Troop G - Includes the following counties: Baker, Calhoun, Chattahoochee, Clay, Colquitt, Decatur, Dougherty, Early, Grady, Lee, Marion, Miller, Mitchell, Quitman, Randolph, Schley, Seminole, Stewart, Sumter, Terrell, Thomas, Webster, Worth
  Post 10 - Americus, Post 12 - Thomasville, Post 14 - Colquitt, Post 39 - Cuthbert, Post 40 - Albany
 Troop H - Includes the following counties: Atkinson, Ben Hill, Berrien, Brooks, Crisp, Coffee, Cook, Dooly, Echols, Houston, Irwin, Lanier, Lowndes, Macon, Peach, Pulaski, Tift, Turner, Wilcox
  Post 13 - Tifton, Post 15 - Perry, Post 30 - Cordele, Post 31 - Valdosta, Post 36 - Douglas
 Troop I - Includes the following counties: Bacon, Brantley, Bryan, Camden, Charlton, Chatham, Clinch, Effingham, Glynn, Liberty, Long, McIntosh, Pierce, Ware, Wayne
  Post 11 - Hinesville, Post 22 - Waycross, Post 23 - Brunswick, Post 35 - Jekyll Island, Post 42 - Rincon
Troop J (Safety Education and Implied Consent) - Troop J contains two units:
 Safety Education Unit - Promotes the safe operation of motor vehicles.
 Implied Consent Unit - Provides support to the Forensics Science Division of the Georgia Bureau of Investigation (GBI) by overseeing and maintaining the breath-alcohol program for the State of Georgia.
Special Weapons and Tactics (SWAT) includes the Crisis Negotiations Team (CNT)
Specialized Collision Reconstruction Team (SCRT)
Commercial Motor Vehicle - Criminal Interdiction Unit (CMV-CIU)
Aviation Unit - Operates 15 helicopters and a Cessna 182 from six locations throughout the State. These are located in Kennesaw, Athens, Reidsville, and Perry.
Nighthawks DUI Task Force - A 10-member DUI Task Force which patrols Clayton, Cobb, DeKalb, Fulton and Gwinnett counties during peak DUI related hours.
Motorcycle Unit - Post 49 - Patrols the Interstate Highways of metropolitan Atlanta with 30 motorcycles.

Other divisions of the Georgia DPS

Capitol Police

Officers with the Capitol Police Division investigate criminal incidents and traffic crashes; manage street closures for events; patrol the streets on Capitol Square and those adjacent to other state buildings; provide courtroom security for Georgia's Supreme Court and Court of Appeals; conduct security assessments and surveillance detection; and deliver personal safety training for state employees and others.

Executive Security
The Executive Security Division is, by law, responsible for two distinct functions: executive security and executive protection.

Executive Security
The Executive Security Unit provides facility security for the Governor's Mansion and provides personal security for the residents.

Executive Protection
Operating under a lieutenant colonel, this unit provides continual security for the governor, lieutenant governor, the speaker of the House, and the chief justice of the Georgia Supreme Court, and their families.  the lieutenant colonel is Tommy Waldrop.

Motor Carrier Compliance

The Motor Carrier Compliance Division (MCCD) performs driver and vehicle inspections of commercial motor vehicles at roadsides, inspection stations, and at carriers' terminals.  The inspections range from "full" vehicle and driver inspections—which include mechanical components—to "driver only" inspections.  These may also include inspections of vehicles transporting hazardous materials.

This division consists of the following units and programs:

HOV Unit - responsible for the enforcement of High Occupancy Lane restrictions and communications.
School Bus Safety Unit - responsible for the annual safety inspection of the state's 17,000 public school buses
Compliance Review Program/Safety Audit - consists of 20 officers who conduct interstate and intrastate compliance reviews.
Size and Weight Enforcement - the operation of 19 permanent weight/inspection stations provide enforcement coverage on the interstates and related by-pass routes.
Commercial Motor Vehicle Safety Program - contains five federally funded and required program areas, Driver/Vehicle Inspections, Traffic Enforcement, Compliance Reviews, Public Information and Education and Data Collection.

Equipment

Current equipment
 Glock Model 45 9mm equipped with a factory Glock +2 magazine extension, a Nightstick TCM-550XL weapons light and Ameriglo Bold night sights—standard issue  
 Glock Model 43 9mm—backup weapon 
 Speer Gold Dot 124 grain +P 9mm duty ammunition
 LWRC Patrol Rifle .223-.556—patrol rifle

Previously issued equipment
 Glock 17 Gen 4 9mm (2015–2019)
 Glock Model 37 .45 GAP (2007–2015) 
 Glock Model 22 .40 S&W (1990s–2007)
 Smith & Wesson Model 5906 9mm or Smith & Wesson Model 4506 .45 ACP—troopers choice (early 1990s to late 1990s)
 Smith & Wesson Model 66 .357 Magnum
 Colt Python .357 Magnum

Vehicles
The GSP currently uses Dodge Chargers which are painted in the blue and gray scheme, and are currently issuing out Dodge Durangos, Dodge Challengers, and Chevrolet Camaros. In addition, they also utilize the Chevrolet Tahoe for their Motor Carrier Compliance Division and K9 units, which includes vehicles in either black, white, or grey color schemes. When these cars are retired they remain in their scheme, unlike the Florida Highway Patrol that paints the tan part of their vehicles before being auctioned off to the public.  Former models used were the Chevrolet Caprice, Ford Crown Victoria Police Interceptor, Pontiac LeMans, BMW 528i (one still kept by the state), Ford Mustang and Ford Thunderbird.

Fallen officers
Since the establishment of the Georgia State Patrol, 26 officers have died in the line of duty.

Controversies 
A Georgia state trooper shot and killed a 60-year old black man in the head in 2020 and was subsequently arrested on counts of murder and assault. Less than a second elapsed between the time the officer left his car and shot the victim. The officer was not indicted. A $4.8 Million settlement was reached.

See also

 Killing of Julian Edward Roosevelt Lewis
 List of law enforcement agencies in Georgia
 State police
 State patrol
 Highway patrol

References

External links
 Georgia State Patrol
 Georgia Dept. of Public Safety

1937 establishments in Georgia (U.S. state)
Government agencies established in 1937
State law enforcement agencies of Georgia (U.S. state)